Gordonsville is the name of several towns in North America:

United States 
Gordonsville, Kentucky
Gordonsville, Minnesota
Gordonsville, Tennessee
Gordonsville, Virginia

Canada 
 Gordonsville, New Brunswick

See also
Gordonville (disambiguation)